Mohamed Ali Gharzoul (born 14 December 1985 in Tarbes) is a French-born Tunisian professional footballer. He also holds French citizenship.

External links
 Profile in PersianLeague.com

1985 births
Living people
Sportspeople from Tarbes
Tunisian footballers
French footballers
French sportspeople of Tunisian descent
Ligue 2 players
CS Sedan Ardennes players
Club Africain players
Expatriate footballers in Iran
Rah Ahan players

Association football central defenders
Footballers from Occitania (administrative region)